Quincy House may refer to:

 Quincy House (Harvard), a residential house at Harvard   
 Quincy House (U.S. Ambassador residence), the U.S. ambassador's residence in Riyadh  
 Josiah Quincy House, a National Historic Landmark home built by Josiah Quincy
 Quincy House (Boston, Massachusetts), a former hotel in downtown Boston
Quincy House (Brookland), a notable residence in Washington, DC.
 Dorothy Quincy Homestead, Quincy, Massachusetts, a U.S. National Historic Landmark